Boissevain may refer to:

People
 Boissevain family, Dutch patrician family
 Adolphe Boissevain, (1843–1921), Dutch banker
 Charles Boissevain (1842–1927), Dutch journalist and newspaper editor
 Charles H. Boissevain (1893–1946), Dutch tuberculosis researcher and botanist
 Willem Frederik Lamoraal Boissevain (1852–1919), Dutch colonial administrator 
 Mia Boissevain (1878 - 1959), Dutch malacologist and feminist
 Angie Boissevain, Soto Zen roshi leader of the Floating Zendo in San Jose, California, USA
 Mies Boissevain-van Lennep (1896–1965), Dutch resistance hero
 Rhoda Elsie Boissevain, West Australian portrait painter
 William Boissevain, West Australian portrait painter

Places
 Boissevain, Manitoba, Canada
 Boissevain, Virginia, USA

Ships
 Boissevain (ship, 1937)
 Boissevain (ship, 1947)